Amroha is a city in the state of Uttar Pradesh in India. It is located north-west of Moradabad, near the Ganga River. It is the administrative headquarters of the Amroha district.

Geography
Amroha is located north-west of Moradabad, near the Sot (सोत) River. Being just 130 km away, Amroha's weather is very similar to Delhi. The city is divided into localities and blocks. The climate of the Amroha is similar to other districts of Western Uttar Pradesh situated at the base of Himalaya which becomes hot in summer and dry & cold in winter.

Demographics
Amroha is a city in Uttar Pradesh. As per the 2011 census, Amroha had a population of 198,471. Population of children within the age group of 0–6 is 28323 which is 14.27% of total population of Amroha (NPP). In Amroha Nagar Palika Parishad, the female sex ratio is of 925 against state average of 912. Moreover, child sex ratio in Amroha is around 950 compared to Uttar Pradesh state average of 902. The total number of literates in Amroha was 198,471, which constituted 53.5% of the population with male literacy of 57.2% and female literacy of 49.3%. The effective literacy rate of 7+ population of Amroha was 62.4%, of which male literacy rate was 66.7% and female literacy rate was 57.6%. The Scheduled Castes and Scheduled Tribes population was 12,039 and 14 respectively. Amroha had 33903 households in 2011.

Economy
Amroha is known for its production of mangoes. Some of the industries in Amroha include cotton & textiles, and small-scale production of cotton cloth, hand-loom weaving, pottery making, sugar milling and secondary ones are carpet manufacturing, wood handicrafts and dholak manufacturing.

Connectivity

Amroha is well connected through Railways and Road with Indian capital New Delhi. Amroha railway station is situated on Delhi-Moradabad line and all passenger trains & most of the express trains stop here. Amroha railway station is on a line built by Oudh and Rohilkhand Railway, 868 miles from Kolkata. Amroha is about 5 km away from NH 24, a four-lane highway which connects New Delhi to Lucknow.

Landmark places

Amrohas has many tourist attractions. Vasudev Temple for Hindus.
Dargah Shah Wilayat of Sufi saint Syed Husain Sharaf-ud-din Soharwardi is visited by people across the country. The Sufi Shah wilyat came to Amroha from Wasit, Iraq in 13th century. At his resting place, scorpions never sting.

Notable people
 Ahmad Hasan Amrohi, Indian Islamic scholar and freedom fighter
 Azeem Amrohvi, Indian Urdu poet
 Bilal Amrohi, Indian actor, grandson of Kamal Amrohi
 Ahmad Saeed Kazmi Islamic scholar from Multan, Pakistan who migrated from Amroha in 1935
 Bhagwan Sahay, ICS, CBE, Padma Bhushan, Former Lt. Governor of Punjab, Governor of Jammu & Kashmir, and Kerala
 Eqbal Mehdi, Pakistani artist
 Izaz Ali Amrohi, Indian Hanafi scholar of Islam
 Jaun Elia, Urdu poet
 Javed Khan Amrohi, Indian actor
 K. A. Nizami, Indian historian and diplomat
 Kamal Amrohi, Indian film director and writer
 Khayal Amrohvi, Pakistani writer and educationist
 Mahboob Ali, Indian politician
 Mashhoor Amrohi, Indian actor, grandson of Kamal Amrohi
 Mohammed Shami, Indian national cricketer
 Mustajab Shelle, Indian painter and writer
 Nasim Amrohvi, Pakistani Urdu lexicographer and writer
 Waqar-ul-Mulk, Indian Muslim politician
 Nisar Ahmed Faruqi, Indian Sufi scholar of Islam
 Qaem Amrohi, Pakistani Urdu poet and philosopher
 Rais Amrohvi, Pakistani writer, elder brother of Jaun Elia
 Saiyed Zegham Murtaza, Journalist, Columnist, Author, Blogger and Documentary Film Maker
 Sadequain, Pakistani artist and calligraphist
 Syed Mahmood Naqvi, Indian earth scientist
 Syed Wajih Ahmad Naqvi, Indian marine scientist
 Vishnu Sahay, ICS, Former Cabinet Secretary, Governor of Assam and Nagaland
 Mohammad Baqar Naqvi (M.B.Naqvi), Pakistan English journalist and writer

See also 
 Amrohi Syed
 Amroha murder case

References

External links
 Amroha Lok Sabha constituency 2019 Election Candidate Website.

 
Cities and towns in Amroha district
Cities in Uttar Pradesh